Dillenia scabrella is an Asian tree species in the family Dilleniaceae.  This species has been recorded from: Bangladesh, Cambodia, Laos, Myanmar, Thailand and Vietnam (where they are called sổ nhám).

References

External Links 
 

scabrella
Trees of Indo-China